Abdul Latif Ansari is a Pakistani politician who has been a member of the Senate of Pakistan from March 2015 to May 2015.

Political career
He was elected to the Senate of Pakistan from Sindh as a candidate of Pakistan Peoples Party in 2015 Pakistani Senate election. In May 2015, he resigned to allow Sherry Rehman to replace him as the member of the Senate.

References

Pakistani senators (14th Parliament)